Trondheim Bilruter or TBR was a municipally owned bus company in Trondheim, Norway between 1951 and 1974. It was merged with the tram operators Trondheim Sporvei and A/S Graakalbanen in 1974 to form Trondheim Trafikkselskap. It is now part of Team Trafikk, a subsidiary of Nettbuss.

The predecessor of the company was Autobuss, a privately owned bus company that started bus operations in Trondheim in 1929. Trondheim Bilruter did not have a monopoly on bus operation in the city. The tram operator Trondheim Sprovei operated some bus lines, and TBR only operated buses within the city limits. The buses operated by TBR were painted dark red or grey.

References 

Bus companies of Trøndelag
Defunct bus companies of Norway
Companies based in Trondheim
Companies formerly owned by municipalities of Norway
Transport companies established in 1951
Transport companies disestablished in 1974
Norwegian companies established in 1951
1974 disestablishments in Norway